Daniel Cornelius O'Connor (August 11, 1868 – March 3, 1942) was a Canadian Major League Baseball first baseman who played for the Louisville Colonels of the American Association in .  The 21-year-old rookie stood 6'2" and weighed 185 lbs.

O'Connor played in 6 games for the Colonels, who won the 1890 AA pennant with a record of 88–44. His first appearance was on June 3 and his last on July 19.  He hit .462 (12-for-26) with 5 runs batted in and 3 runs scored.  At first base he handled 58 chances without an error and participated in 3 double plays.
 
O'Connor died in his hometown of Guelph, Ontario, Canada at the age of 73.

External links

1868 births
1942 deaths
19th-century baseball players
Akron Summits players
Baseball people from Ontario
Canadian expatriate baseball players in the United States
Major League Baseball players from Canada
Canadian baseball players
Canadian sportspeople of Irish descent
Major League Baseball first basemen
Louisville Colonels players
Sportspeople from Guelph
Omaha Omahogs players
Omaha Lambs players
Evansville Hoosiers players
Terre Haute Hottentots players
Oshkosh Indians players
Mansfield Electricans players
Guelph Maple Leafs players